Rhodolaena bakeriana is a tree in the family Sarcolaenaceae. It is endemic to Madagascar.

Description
Rhodolaena bakeriana grows as a medium-sized tree. Its twigs are hairy. It has small to medium leaves, obovate, elliptic or oblong in shape. The inflorescences have one or two flowers on a long stem. The fruits are medium-sized and woody. The fruits may be dispersed by lemurs.

Taxonomy
The Latin specific epithet Bakeriana is in honor of the English botanist John Gilbert Baker.

Distribution and habitat
Rhodolaena bakeriana is only found in the central to north central regions of Analamanga, Sava, Haute Matsiatra and Alaotra-Mangoro. Its habitat is humid to subhumid evergreen forests from  altitude.

Threats
Rhodolaena bakeriana is threatened by timber exploitation. Its habitat is also at risk from clearing for agriculture.

References

bakeriana
Endemic flora of Madagascar
Trees of Madagascar
Plants described in 1886
Taxa named by Henri Ernest Baillon